Ilusiones ópticas is a 2009 Chilean dramedy film directed by Cristián Jiménez in his debut feature.

Plot 
The film tells three interwoven stories with irony and black humor. They include a mall security guard who falls in love with an elegant thief, an efficient office worker sent to a training workshop for the unemployed by his company, and a blind skier who regains his sight and becomes suddenly terrified of the city. These three men are immersed in circumstances and desires that they don't fully comprehend.

Cast
 Ivan Alvarez de Araya
 Gregory Cohen
 Eduardo Paxeco
 Paola Lattus
 Álvaro Rudolphy
 Valentina Vargas

References

External links

2009 films
Chilean comedy-drama films
2000s Spanish-language films
2009 comedy-drama films